Tahlia Street (also called Prince Mohammed bin Abdulaziz Street) is a fashion and shopping street in the mid-town of Jeddah, Saudi Arabia.

The street contains many upscale department shops, and boutiques, such as Prada, Gucci, Versace, Cartier, Chanel, Louis Vuitton, Dolce & Gabbana, Ralph Lauren and Giorgio Armani. As the Champs-Élysées is for Paris, Tahlia Street is believed to be the heart of Jeddah and Saudi Arabia's wealthiest district.

In 1981, Mayor Mohammed Said Farsi wanted to place a monumental statue on Tahlia Street. He asked the Belgian artist Hubert Minnebo to make a 15 meter high copper statue. Since 1982 the statue 'Hope for the right path' has been on the Sword Roundabout.

This commercial street is the destination of soccer fans, who drive up and down waving club scarves and sounding their car horns to celebrate victory.

An identically named street in Saudi Arabia's capital Riyadh, Prince Mohammed bin Abdulaziz Street, has been nicknamed Tahlia Street by the residents as it coincidentally shares many similarities with the original Tahlia Street in Jeddah.

Gallery

See also
 Transport in Saudi Arabia

References

Shopping districts and streets
Roads in Saudi Arabia
Tourist attractions in Jeddah
Transport in Jeddah
Geography of Jeddah